Zhong Ke (born 10 August 1995) is a Chinese footballer who plays for China League One side Guangdong South China Tiger.

Club career
Zhong Ke started his professional football career in August 2016 when he joined Hong Kong Premier League side R&F, which was the satellite team of Chinese Super League side Guangzhou R&F. He made his senior debut on 8 January 2017 in a 5–0 away win against Kitchee. On 12 February 2017, he scored his first goal in the 2016–17 Hong Kong Sapling Cup which R&F lost to Eastern 7–1. He played seven league matches for R&F in the 2016–17 season and stayed at the club for another season.

Career statistics

1League Cups include Hong Kong Senior Challenge Shield, Hong Kong League Cup and Hong Kong Sapling Cup.

References

1995 births
Living people
Chinese footballers
Footballers from Guangzhou
Association football midfielders
R&F (Hong Kong) players
Guangdong South China Tiger F.C. players
Hong Kong Premier League players
China League One players